The Oxford Imps are an improvisational comedy troupe based in Oxford, England, where they currently perform every Monday during University term time at The Jericho Tavern pub (since 2021); previously, they performed at The Wheatsheaf pub. They also perform annually at the Edinburgh Festival Fringe at the Gilded Balloon.

History 

The Oxford Imps were formed by final year student Hannah Madsen and first performed at the Wheatsheaf pub in Oxford High Street in January 2004. Since 2004, the Imps performed at the Edinburgh Fringe. They have previously toured to Bosnia, France, Utrecht in the Netherlands, and Grahamstown South Africa. They have also toured numerous times to the US. to Chicago and Providence, and Nashville.

They have performed radio shows on Oxide Radio, BBC Radio Oxford, and Fest FM.

The Oxford Imps celebrated their tenth anniversary in February 2014, with their 32 members performing at Oxford's New Theatre.

TV appearances

On 25 March 2009, the Oxford Imps' appearance on British daytime TV quiz Eggheads was broadcast on BBC2.

Alumni

Former members of The Oxford Imps include: 

 Rachel Parris - stand-up comedian
 Sophie Duker - stand-up comedian 
 Ivo Graham - stand-up comedian

See also
The Oxford Revue
Teams who have defeated the Eggheads

References

External links
Official website

Arts organizations established in 2004
Amateur theatre companies in England
Culture in Oxford
Clubs and societies of the University of Oxford
Student theatre in the United Kingdom
British comedy troupes